KAMB (101.5 FM, Celebration Radio) is an American radio station broadcasting a Contemporary Christian format. The station is owned by Central Valley Broadcasting Company, Inc. Licensed to Merced, California, United States, KAMB is an independent, commercial-free, listener-supported station and serves portions of Northern California including areas of the Central Valley and Bay Area.

Translators
In addition to the main station, KAMB is relayed by broadcast translators across the Northern California area.

External links

AMB
Mass media in Merced County, California
Mass media in Tuolumne County, California
Merced, California
Radio stations established in 1967